The 1955 All-Ireland Senior Camogie Championship Final was the 23rd All-Ireland Final and the deciding match of the 1955 All-Ireland Senior Camogie Championship, an inter-county camogie tournament for the top teams in Ireland.

This final is regarded as one of the greatest in camogie history. Cork took an early lead, but trailed 3-2 to 1-4 at half-time. Dublin powered through to win by eight points. Top scorers for Dublin were Sophie Brack and Frances Maher(three goals each), while Noreen Duggan scored 3-2 for Cork.

References

All-Ireland Senior Camogie Championship Final
All-Ireland Senior Camogie Championship Final
All-Ireland Senior Camogie Championship Final, 1955
All-Ireland Senior Camogie Championship Finals
Cork county camogie team matches
Dublin county camogie team matches